Joachim Svendsen (born October 16, 1994) is a Norwegian ice hockey goaltender who is currently playing with Vålerenga in the Norwegian GET-ligaen.

External links

1994 births
Living people
Hasle-Løren IL players
Norwegian ice hockey goaltenders
Norwegian ice hockey players
Lørenskog IK players
Manglerud Star Ishockey players
Vålerenga Ishockey players
Ice hockey people from Oslo